ISO 3166-2:ST is the entry for São Tomé and Príncipe (written without diacritics in the standard) in ISO 3166-2, part of the ISO 3166 standard published by the International Organization for Standardization (ISO), which defines codes for the names of the principal subdivisions (e.g., provinces or states) of all countries coded in ISO 3166-1.

Currently for São Tomé and Príncipe, ISO 3166-2 codes are defined for 1 autonomous region and 6 districts. Each code consists of two parts, separated by a hyphen. The second part is a letter for an autonomous region or two digits for a district.

Current codes
Subdivision names are listed as in the ISO 3166-2 standard published by the ISO 3166 Maintenance Agency (ISO 3166/MA).

Changes
The following changes to the entry have been announced by the ISO 3166/MA since the first publication of ISO 3166-2 in 1998:

See also
 Subdivisions of São Tomé and Príncipe
 FIPS region codes of São Tomé and Príncipe

References

External links
 ISO Online Browsing Platform: ST
 Regions of Sao Tome and Principe, Statoids.com

2:ST
ISO 3166-2
São Tomé and Príncipe geography-related lists

pt:Subdivisões de São Tomé e Príncipe#ISO 3166-2:ST